Cha Mi-kyung (Korean:차미경; born on 25 July 1965) is a South Korean actress. She made her acting debut in 2007, since then, she has appeared in number of films and television series. She is known for her roles in Itaewon Class (2020), Racket Boys and The Red Sleeve (2021). She has acted in films as: Kim Ji-young: Born 1982 (2019) and Three Sisters (2020) among others. In 2021 she appeared in TV series Our Beloved Summer and in 2022 she is cast in TV series Showtime Begins! alongside Park Hae-jin.

Career
Cha Mi-kyung is affiliated to artist management company Different Company. She is also a founding member of the Gamagol Theater Company.

In 2021, she appeared as Oh Mae grandma in SBS sports TV series Racket Boys, for which she was nominated for Best Supporting Actress Award for an Actress at 2021 SBS Drama Awards.

Filmography

Films

Television series

Awards and nominations

Notes

References

External links
 
 Cha Mi-kyung on Daum 
 

21st-century South Korean actresses
South Korean film actresses
South Korean television actresses
Living people
1965 births